Niscemi is a little town and comune in the province of Caltanissetta, Sicily, Italy. It has a population of 27,558. It is located not far from Gela and Caltagirone and 90 km from Catania.

Etymology
The name Niscemi is derived from the Arabic word نَشَم neshem or its singular form نَشَمَة neshemeh, this being the name of a particular type of tree.

Main sights

Santa Maria d'Itria: chiesa madre or mother church of town

World War II
During World War II, Niscemi was the location of Ponte Olivo Airfield, a military airfield used by the United States Twelfth Air Force during the Italian campaign. After the war the area was redeveloped and no evidence of the wartime airfield remains.

American military installation

Today, there is a military radio station for naval communication, U.S. Naval Radio Transmitter Facility (NRTF) Niscemi.

The United States Navy installation is the focus of ongoing protest by locally based activist groups, who oppose it and demand its removal on grounds of health (danger from electromagnetic radiation), environmental damage and opposition to the use of  armed drones in the Middle East, allegedly guided from this base. Allegations of armed drones being operated from this base have never been verified however, as the newly installed MUOS (Mobile User Objective System) was intended as an upgrade to legacy communication equipment, and is not intended to communicate with unmanned flying drones. Niscemi inhabitants say the Berlusconi government did not consult them before granting the US the use of the location.

See also
 Naval Radio Transmitter Facility (NRTF) Niscemi

References

 Maurer, Maurer. Air Force Combat Units of World War II. Maxwell AFB, Alabama: Office of Air Force History, 1983.

External links
 Site of Niscemi's Civic Council
 Site of Niscemi's Cemetery